Dionysopithecidae is an extinct family of fossil catarrhines and the earliest-known and most primitive members of the Pliopithecoidea superfamily, with fossils in Sihong in China dating to 18–17 million years ago for species Dionysopithecus shuangouensis and Platodontopithecus jianghuaiensis.

A single lower molar found in Ban San Klang in Thailand is similar to those found in Sihong but sufficiently different to be considered a different species, Dionysopithecus orientalis.

They are sometimes treated as a subfamily of Pliopithecidae as 'Dionysopithecinae'.

References

 The Illustrated Encyclopedia of the Prehistoric World page 434.

Miocene primates of Asia
Pliocene primates
Miocene extinctions
Prehistoric apes
†Pliopithecidae
Prehistoric mammal families